Justus Carl Hasskarl (6 December 1811 – 5 January 1894) was a German explorer and botanist specializing in Pteridophytes, Bryophytes and Spermatophytes. He was co-founder of the Society of Natural Curiosities of India, in Bavaria and spent his time researching flora of Indonesia for years.

Biography
Justus Carl Hasskarl was born in Kassel in the Kingdom of Westphalia. In his earlier life he studied at a plant nursery in Poppelsdorf in 1827. And later in 1834 he studied Natural History while at the same time, prepared himself for an expedition to the tropics.

In 1836, he traveled to Java and tried to make a living through his knowledge in Physics and Medicine, with little success. Subsequently, he sent a request to the Governor general to work in 's Lands Plantentuin and a year later he was appointed as assistant curator. With director Johannes Elias Teijsmann, they rearranged their crops to taxonomic families, which would result in the displacement of many specimens in the botanical garden. Together they organized expeditions to various parts of modern Indonesia and expand the number of plants collection in the Botanic Garden. Hasskarl also proposed starting a library (Bibliotheca Bogoriensis) which was opened in 1842 and Herbarium Bogoriense in 1844.

In 1852, the Netherlands government sent him to Lima and in early 1853, Justus made an expedition to the interior of Peru and even reaching the eastern border of Lake Titicaca, where he gathered Cinchona trees for Malaria treatment. In 1854 he sent his collections of seeds and specimens back to the Netherlands and introduced Cinchona trees to Java, the extract of the tree would later be used to make quinine. However, due to his worsening health he had to return to Netherlands in 1856.

Later he participated in examining and describe the Commelinaceae of Georg August Schweinfurth's Abyssinian plant collections and also worked on several plant families, such as Cyathea junghuhniana in Leiden.

In 1855 he became correspondent of the Royal Netherlands Academy of Arts and Sciences, he resigned in 1859.

Some publications 
1856 - Filice javanicae, Batavia
1856 - Retzia observation of PLANTIS botanicae Botanici Bogoriensis horticulture, Leiden
1859 - Hortus Bogoriensis descr. seu Retziae editio nova (1. Teil, Amsterdam 1858, 2. Teil in Bonplandia
1866 - Neuer Schlüssel zu Rumphs Herbarium amboinense, Halle
1867 - Horti malabarici Rheedeani clavis locupletissima, Dresden
1870 - Commelinaceae indicae, Vienna
1847 - Plantae javanicae rariores, Berlin

Honours 
The gender Hasskarlia Baill. in the family Euphorbiaceae is named in his honor.

See also
 List of botanists by author abbreviation

References

External links 
 

1811 births
1894 deaths
19th-century Dutch explorers
19th-century Dutch botanists
Dutch explorers
H
Members of the Royal Netherlands Academy of Arts and Sciences
Scientists from Kassel
People from the Kingdom of Westphalia